Malá Morávka is a municipality and village in Bruntál District in the Moravian-Silesian Region of the Czech Republic. It has about 600 inhabitants.

Administrative parts
The village of Karlov pod Pradědem is an administrative part of Malá Morávka.

Geography
Malá Morávka is located in the Hrubý Jeseník mountain range. The peaks of the three highest mountains of Hrubý Jeseník, including Praděd, lie in the northwestern part of the municipal territory. The Moravice river and the Bělokamenný Stream flows though the territory and join in the village.

References

Villages in Bruntál District